The 14th General Convention of the Nepali Congress, in which delegates of the Nepali Congress Party re-elected Sher Bahadur Deuba as chairman, was held December 13–15, 2021, at Bhrikuti Mandap, Kathmandu. Similarly, the convention of the six Province was held from 2–3 December. The convention of the Pradesh 2 was delayed and held after National Convention on 22–23 December 2021.

Nearly 850,000 active members of the party throughout the country took part in this occasion from ward to national level. The total of 4,783 delegates were elected from 165 constituencies- which in turn voted to elect central level portfolios.

Central Committee Portfolio Election

2nd Round for Party Chairman

1st Round for Party Chairman

Party Portfolios

Surveys and opinion polls

Central Committee Members 
As per the constitution of the party, 35 people shall be elected under open category, 9 under women, 21 from provinces at the rate of 3 from each, 9 from Dalit, 15 from Adivasi Janajati, 13 from Khas Arya, 9 from Madheshi, 4 from women, 3 women from central members and 3 women members.

Province category

Nominated

Members of Central Working Committee 
On 28 January 2022, NC president Sher Bahadur Deuba formed Central Working Committee which was approved by central committee.

Provincial portfolio election

District president election

References 

Nepali Congress
Political history of Nepal
Internal elections of political parties in Nepal
Nepali-language culture